Lomma Municipality is a municipality in Skåne County in southern Sweden, about 10 km north of Malmö. Its seat is located in Lomma with secondary locality Bjärred being of almost equal population size.

The present municipality was created through the amalgamation of the market town Lomma and the rural municipality Flädie. It took place in 1963, between the two nationwide local government reforms of 1952 and 1971.

Geography

The small municipality borders to Kävlinge Municipality, Burlöv Municipality, Staffanstorp Municipality and Lund Municipality. As Burlöv also is notably small, Lomma Municipality almost borders to Malmö Municipality too.

It is situated by Öresund, at the inlet of the small river Höje å. Along the river lies a yacht marina. In the old industrial area along the river new appartements and villas are erected, with some facing the river or the beach. The beaches along its coasts also attract visitors from other municipalities; Lomma Municipality's beaches are the principal beaches for people from the beach-less Lund.

 to the north-east is the university city of Lund, with some 80,000 inhabitants, about the same distance as to Malmö (with its 285,000 inhabitants) to the south. Lomma Municipality is also considered part of Metropolitan Malmö, showing itself for instance by the 6,500 commuters that live in there. Travelling to and from Lomma Municipality is easy, as a main highway actually passes straight through the town of Lomma, connecting with Lund and Malmö, and with other cities to the north.

Geologically, its terrain is almost completely flat levelled, which is the custom for south-western Skåne as a whole.

Localities
There were three localities in the municipality as of 2018.

Of note is also Alnarp, where one of the main campuses of the Swedish University of Agricultural Sciences is located.

History
The area where Lomma Municipality is now is located between two small rivers, and was inhabited by hunters in the Stone Age. The name Lomma can be traced to 1085, and in the ensuing centuries it established some wealth thanks to merchancy with the episcopal see in Lund.

Nonetheless, the area was only a village until Sweden's first cement works was established in 1871. The ground consists of a certain clay stemming from the last ice age, and is available in large quantities in Lomma Municipality. A fully fledged industry was started in the 1860s, and by the end of the century Lomma Municipality had five brick factories. The bricks from Lomma are yellow of appearance and were regarded as the highest kind of bricks during that century. One church built with those bricks is the church in Lomma, (Lomma kyrka), a large neo Gothic church that was finished in the 1870s.

The coat of arms depicts an anchor - showing the importance of the harbour - and a brick wall, indicating that Lomma Municipality once actually had city rights as well as its brick industry.

See also
 Municipalities of Sweden

References

External links

Official website
 article Lomma (municipalsamhälle) From Nordisk familjebok

Municipalities of Skåne County